Trechini is a large tribe of ground beetles in the family Carabidae. There are more than 270 genera and over 2,400 described species in Trechini, found throughout the world.

The ground beetles of this tribe are small, typically less than 5 mm in length and sometimes 1 mm or less. They occur in a wide variety of habitats on every continent except Antarctica. Though the extinct genus Antarctotrechus indicates that they were formerly present on that continent.

Genera
These genera belong to the tribe Trechini:

 Subtribe Aepina Fowler, 1887
 Aepopsis Jeannel, 1922
 Aepus Leach in Samouelle, 1819
 Kenodactylus Broun, 1909
 Kiwitrechus Larochelle & Larivière, 2007
 Maoritrechus Brookes, 1932
 Neanops Britton, 1962
 Oarotrechus Townsend, 2010
 Temnostega Enderlein, 1905
 Thalassobius Solier, 1849
 Waiputrechus Townsend, 2010
 Subtribe Perileptina Sloane, 1903
 Apoplotrechus Alluaud, 1915
 Neoblemus Jeannel, 1923
 Perileptus Schaum, 1860
 Subtribe Trechina Bonelli, 1810
 Accoella Ueno, 1990
 Acheroniotes Lohaj & Lakota, 2010
 Adriaphaenops Noesske, 1928
 Aepiblemus Belousov & Kabak, 1993
 Agonotrechus Jeannel, 1923
 Agostinia Jeannel, 1928
 Alanorites Belousov, 1998
 Albanotrechus Casale & V.B.Gueorguiev, 1994
 Allegrettia Jeannel, 1928
 Allotrechiama Ueno, 1970
 Ameroduvalius Valentine, 1952
 Anchotrechus Jeannel, 1927
 Andinorites Mateu & Belles, 1980
 Andinotrechus Mateu, 1981
 Anillidius Jeannel, 1928
 Anophthalmus Sturm, 1844
 Aphaenopidius G.Müller, 1913
 Aphaenops Bonvouloir, 1862
 Aphaenopsis G.Müller, 1913
 Apocimmerites Belousov, 1998
 Apoduvalius Jeannel, 1953
 Aputrechisibus Trezzi, 2007
 Arctaphaenops Meixner, 1925
 Aspidaphaenops Ueno, 2006
 Austrotrechus B.Moore, 1972
 Awatrechus Ueno, 1955
 Balazucellus Deuve, 2001
 Bathytrechus Ueno, 2005
 Beronaphaenops B.V.Gueorguiev, 2012
 Birmaphaenops Deuve, 2017
 Blemus Dejean, 1821
 Boldoriella Jeannel, 1928
 Boreaphaenops Ueno, 2002
 Bothynotrechus B.Moore, 1972
 Casaleaphaenops Tian; Huang & Ma, 2021
 Cathaiaphaenops Deuve, 1996
 Caucasaphaenops Belousov, 1999
 Caucasorites Belousov & Zamotajlov, 1997
 Chaetoduvalius Jeannel, 1928
 Chaetotrechiama Ueno, 1982
 Chiapadytes Vigna Taglianti, 1977
 Chu Tian & He, 2020
 Cimbrodytes Piva, 2021
 Cimmerites Jeannel, 1928
 Cimmeritodes Deuve, 1996
 Ckacus Tian & Huang, 2021
 Columbitrechus Mateu, 1982
 Coreoblemus Ueno, 1969
 Croatotrechus Casale & Jalzic, 1999
 Dabatrechus Ueno, 2004
 Dactylotrechus Belousov & Kabak, 2003
 Daiconotrechus Ueno, 1971
 Dalmataphaenops Monguzzi, 1993
 Darlingtonea Valentine, 1952
 Derossiella Queinnec, 2008
 Deuveaphaenops Tian & Huang, 2017
 Dianotrechus Tian, 2016
 Doderotrechus Vigna Taglianti, 1968
 Dongoblemus Deuve & Tian, 2016
 Dongodytes Deuve, 1993
 Dracotrechus Ueno, 2010
 Duvalioblemus Deuve, 1995
 Duvaliomimus Jeannel, 1928
 Duvaliopsis Jeannel, 1928
 Duvalius Delarouzée, 1859
 Eocnides Jeannel, 1954
 Epaphiopsis Ueno, 1953
 Epaphiotrechus Deuve & Kavanaugh, 2016
 Epaphius Leach in Samouelle, 1819
 Erebotrechus Britton, 1964
 Escolatrechus Mateu, 2003
 Eutrechopsis B.Moore, 1972
 Eutrechus B.Moore, 1972
 Geotrechus Jeannel, 1919
 Giraffaphaenops Deuve, 2002
 Glabroduvalius Vrbica; Curcic; Antic & Curcic, 2013
 Goedetrechus B.Moore, 1972
 Gotoblemus Ueno, 1970
 Graciliblemus Deuve & Tian, 2016
 Guatemalatrechus Trezzi, 2003
 Guiaphaenops Deuve, 2002
 Guizhaphaenops Vigna Taglianti, 1997
 Guizhaphaenopsoides Tian; Huang & Li, 2021
 Gulaphaenops Ueno, 1987
 Himalaphaenops Ueno, 1980
 Himalotrechus Belousov; Kabak & J.Schmidt, 2019
 Homaloderodes Jeannel, 1962
 Huoyanodytes Tian & Huang, 2016
 Iberotrechus Jeannel, 1920
 Iga Ueno, 1953
 Incatrechus Mateu & Belles, 1982
 Inotrechus Dolzhanski & Ljovushkin, 1989
 Ishidatrechus Ueno, 1956
 Ishikawatrechus Habu, 1950
 Italaphaenops Ghidini, 1964
 Iyotrechus Ueno & Naito, 2009
 Jalzicaphaenops Lohaj & Lakota, 2010
 Jeannelius Kurnakov, 1959
 Jiangxiaphaenops Ueno & Clarke, 2007
 Jiulongotrechus Tian; Huang & Wang, 2015
 Junaphaenops Ueno, 1997
 Junnanotrechus Ueno & Yin, 1993
 Kettlotrechus Townsend, 2010
 Kosswigia Jeannel, 1947
 Kozlovites Jeannel, 1935
 Kupetrechus Larochelle & Larivière, 2007
 Kurasawatrechus Yoshida & Nomura, 1952
 Kusumia Ueno, 1952
 Lanxangaphaenops Deuve, 2012
 Laoblemus Ueno, 2006
 Laosaphaenops Deuve, 2000
 Lessinodytes Vigna Taglianti, 1982
 Libotrechus Ueno, 1998
 Luoxiaotrechus Tian & Yin, 2013
 Luyatrechus M.Etonti & Mateu, 2000
 Luzonotrechus Ueno, 1979
 Mamesdytes Trezzi, 2003
 Masuzoa Ueno, 1960
 Masuzonoblemus Ueno, 1989
 Mayaphaenops Vigna Taglianti, 1977
 Meganophthalmus Kurnakov, 1959
 Mexaphaenops Bolivar y Pieltain, 1942
 Mexitrechus Barr, 1982
 Miaotrechus Tian; Chen & Ma, 2020
 Microblemus Ueno, 2007
 Mimanillus B.Moore, 1972
 Mimotrechus B.Moore, 1972
 Minimaphaenops Deuve, 2000
 Minosaphaenops Queinnec, 2008
 Minutotrechus Deuve & Kavanaugh, 2016
 Nannotrechus Winkler, 1926
 Nanotrechiama Belousov & Kabak, 2018
 Neaphaenops Jeannel, 1920
 Nelsonites Valentine, 1952
 Neotrechus G.Müller, 1913
 Nesaeoduvalius Casale & Giachino, 2016
 Nesiotrechus Ueno, 1995
 Nipponaphaenops Ueno, 1971
 Nototrechus B.Moore, 1972
 Nunbergites Pawlowski & Stachowiak, 1991
 Omalodera Blanchard, 1842
 Oodinotrechus Ueno, 1998
 Oroblemites Ueno & Pawlowski, 1981
 Oroblemus Ueno & Yoshida, 1966
 Orotrechus G.Müller, 1913
 Oxytrechus Jeannel, 1927
 Panaphaenops Tian; Huang & Ma, 2021
 Paracimmerites Belousov, 1998
 Paraphaenops Jeannel, 1916
 Paratrechiotes Ueno, 1995
 Paratrechus Jeannel, 1920
 Petraphaenops Delic; Kapla & Colla, 2019
 Pheggomisetes Knirsch, 1923
 Pilosaphaenops Deuve & Tian, 2008
 Plesioaphaenops Deuve & Tian, 2011
 Pogonoschema Jeannel, 1927
 Pontodytes Casale & Giachino, 1989
 Porocimmerites Belousov, 1998
 Protrechiama Belousov & Kabak, 2003
 Pseudanophthalmus Jeannel, 1920
 Pseudaphaenops Winkler, 1912
 Pseudocnides Jeannel, 1927
 Pseudotrechisibus Mateu & Belles, 1982
 Puertrechus Belousov & Kabak, 2014
 Putzeysius Jeannel, 1962
 Qianaphaenops Ueno, 2000
 Qianotrechus Ueno, 2000
 Queinnectrechus Deuve, 1992
 Rakantrechus Ueno, 1951
 Ryugadous Habu, 1950
 Sardaphaenops Cerruti & Henrot, 1956
 Satotrechus Ueno, 2006
 Sbordoniella Vigna Taglianti, 1980
 Scotoplanetes Absolon, 1913
 Scototrechus Britton, 1962
 Shenaphaenops Ueno, 1999
 Shennongotrechus Ueno, 2004
 Shenoblemus Tian & Fang, 2020
 Shilinotrechus Ueno, 2003
 Shiqianaphaenops Tian, 2016
 Shuangheaphaenops Tian, 2017
 Shuaphaenops Ueno, 1999
 Sichuanotrechus Deuve, 2005
 Sidublemus Tian & Yin, 2013
 Sinaphaenops Ueno & Wang, 1991
 Sinocimmerites Deuve, 2007
 Sinotrechiama Ueno, 2000
 Sinotroglodytes Deuve, 1996
 Sloanella Jeannel, 1927
 Speotrechus Jeannel, 1922
 Stevensius Jeannel, 1923
 Stygiotrechus Ueno, 1958
 Subilsia Español, 1967
 Sumatrechus Deuve, 2005
 Superbotrechus Deuve & Tian, 2009
 Suzuka Ueno, 1956
 Taiwanotrechus Ueno, 1987
 Taniatrechus Belousov & Dolzhanski, 1994
 Tasmanorites Jeannel, 1927
 Tasmanotrechus B.Moore, 1972
 Taurocimmerites Belousov, 1998
 Thalassoduvalius Ueno, 1956
 Tianeotrechus Tian & Tang, 2016
 Tianzhuaphaenops Zhao & Tian, 2016
 Tienmutrechus Suenson, 1957
 Tonkinaphaenops Deuve, 2013
 Toshiaphaenops Ueno, 1999
 Trechepaphiama Deuve & Kavanaugh, 2016
 Trechepaphiopsis Deuve & Kavanaugh, 2016
 Trechiama Jeannel, 1927
 Trechiamiotes Deuve, 1998
 Trechicomimus Mateu & Nègre, 1972
 Trechiella Jeannel, 1927
 Trechimorphus Jeannel, 1927
 Trechinotus Jeannel, 1962
 Trechiotes Jeannel, 1954
 Trechisibus Motschulsky, 1862
 Trechistus B.Moore, 1972
 Trechoblemus Ganglbauer, 1891
 Trechus Clairville, 1806
 Trichaphaenops Jeannel, 1916
 Troglocimmerites Ljovuschkin, 1970
 Tropidotrechus Jeannel, 1927
 Typhlotrechus G.Müller, 1913
 Uenoaphaenops Tian & He, 2020
 Uenoites Belousov & Kabak, 2016
 Uenotrechus Deuve & Tian, 1999
 Ushijimaella Ueno, 1980
 Velebitaphaenops Casale & Jalzic, 2012
 Velesaphaenops S.Curcic et al., 2018
 Vietotrechus Ueno, 1995
 Wanhuaphaenops Tian & Wang, 2016
 Wanoblemus Tian & Fang, 2016
 Wulongoblemus Ueno, 2007
 Xenotrechus Barr & Krekeler, 1967
 Xiangxius Tian; Huang & Li, 2021
 Xuedytes Tian & Huang, 2017
 Yalongaphaenops Belousov & Kabak, 2021
 Yamautidius Ueno, 1957
 Yanzaphaenops Ueno, 2010
 Yunotrechus Tian & Huang, 2014
 Zhijinaphaenops Ueno & Ran, 2002
 Subtribe Trechodina Jeannel, 1926
 Amblystogenium Enderlein, 1905
 Canarobius Machado, 1987
 Cnides Motschulsky, 1862
 Cothresia Jeannel, 1964
 Cyphotrechodes Jeannel, 1926
 Eotrechodes Ueno; Lafer & Sundukov, 1995
 Himalotrechodes Ueno, 1981
 Iberotrechodes Faille et al., 2021
 Pachydesus Motschulsky, 1864
 Pachytrechodes Jeannel, 1960
 Paratrechodes Jeannel, 1926
 Scaurotrechodes Geginat, 2006
 Spelaeovulcania Machado, 1987
 Sporades Fauvel, 1882
 Thalassophilus Wollaston, 1854
 Trechobembix Jeannel, 1926
 Trechodes Blackburn, 1901
 Trechosia Jeannel, 1926
 Trechosiella Jeannel, 1960
 Not placed in a subtribe
 †Antarctotrechus Ashworth & Erwin, 2016
 †Trechinites Heer, 1862
 †Trechoides Motschulsky, 1856

References

Further reading

External links

 

Trechinae
Articles created by Qbugbot